Yunnanilus obtusirostris is a species of ray-finned fish, a stone loach in the genus Yunnanilus. Its type locality is the West Dragon Spring, which flows into Fuxian Lake in Chengjiang County, Yunnan. It mau be a species in the genus Heminoemacheilus rather than Yunnanilus. The specific name is a compound of the Latin rostrum meaning a "beak" and obtusus meaning "blunt", this refers to the species' short snout.

References

O
Taxa named by Yang Jun-Xing
Fish described in 1995